Aleksa Vukanović (born 18 June 1992) is a Serbian professional footballer who plays as a forward for Chinese Super League club Meizhou Hakka.

Club career

Early career
Vukanović started his career with hometown team Hercegovac. Later he moved to ČSK Čelarevo, where he played in the Serbian League Vojvodina between 2010 and 2014. In summer 2014, he moved to OFK Bačka, where he made Serbian First League debut against Sloga Kraljevo on 23 August 2014. Next summer, Vukanović returned to ČSK after club promotion in the First League.

Napredak
Vukanović joined Napredak Kruševac in summer 2016. On 22 July 2016, he scored a goal in his debut for Napredak in a 2–2 tie against Red Star Belgrade. On 27 October 2018, he scored a goal with his heel in a 1–1 tie against Partizan. By November that year, he was the top scorer in the entire league.

Red Star Belgrade
On 18 January 2019, Vukanović signed a three-year contract with Red Star Belgrade. On 27 August 2019, he scored a goal in the Champions League play-off in a 1–1 tie against Young Boys, which resulted in Red Star's qualification to the Champions League that season.

Meizhou Hakka
On 21 April 2022, Vukanović joined Chinese Super League club Meizhou Hakka.

Career statistics

Honours
Red Star Belgrade
Serbian SuperLiga: 2018–19, 2019–20, 2020–21
Serbian Cup: 2020–21

References

External links
 
 
 

1992 births
Living people
People from Bačka Palanka
Association football forwards
Serbian footballers
FK ČSK Čelarevo players
OFK Bačka players
FK Napredak Kruševac players
Meizhou Hakka F.C. players
Serbian First League players
Serbian SuperLiga players
Chinese Super League players
Serbian expatriate footballers
Expatriate footballers in China
Serbian expatriate sportspeople in China